Qiao Qingchen (born 1939 in Zhengzhou, Henan) is a Chinese Air Force general who served as the commander of the PLA Air Force from 2002 to 2007.

References
China Vitae - Qiao Qingchen

1939 births
Living people
People's Liberation Army generals from Henan
Commanders of the People's Liberation Army Air Force
People from Zhengzhou